Dr. Hans Müller (13 January 1915 – 4 December 1994) was a German-born Ashkenazi Jewish physician who immigrated to China and made contributions to improving health care in China over several decades. Müller contributed in the research effort into hepatitis B and development of a vaccine, in addition, he became the Vice President of Beijing Medical University in China. Müller was also elected a member of the Chinese People's Political Consultative Conference.

Early life 
Hans Müller was born in Düsseldorf-Golzheim, Germany as the only child of Henriette Müller née Ballin (a niece of the shipping magnate Albert Ballin, died 1949) and Simon Fred Müller (died 1952). His father owned an electrical goods factory in Düsseldorf. Because he was Jewish, Simon Fred Müller was held captive in the Theresienstadt concentration camp from 1942 to 1945. 

Because it was difficult for a Jewish student to go to a German university at the time, Müller went to Switzerland to do so. Hans Müller went to study medicine at the University of Basel. At the University of Basel, he met a Chinese student named Chiang Zhaoxian, who told Müller about China, its culture, history and ongoing events.

Career 
Hans Müller left Switzerland in April 1939 after receiving his doctorate and traveled to Hong Kong via Marseille. During June and July of the same year, he made his way to Yan'an via Nanning, Guiyang, Chongqing, Chengdu, Baoji, and Xi'an. 

In Yan'an, he met with Mao Zedong and worked in the emergency room of the International Peace Hospital. He held medical posts in the Eighth Route Army and the People's Liberation Army, training many doctors. After the war, he held a position in the Changchun Hospital. The further stages of his career were an appointment as Professor at the Shenyang Medical College, where he later served Dean and head of pediatrics, an appointment as Professor of Internal Medicine at Beijing's Jishuitan Hospital, and finally vice president of Beijing Medical University. He conducted research in the areas of pediatric medicine and hepatitis B.

Honors and awards 
 1989: Outstanding International Medical Worker (Presented by the PRC Ministry of Health)

Personal 
Müller was married in 1949 to Kyoko Nakamura (中村京子) a Japanese nurse with whom he had a daughter (Mimi Müller, 米米, born 1950) and a son (Dehua Muller, born 1953). He became a Chinese citizen in 1950.

In 1994, Müller died in China after a long history of heart disease. Müller is buried at the Babaoshan Revolutionary Cemetery in Beijing.

Legacy 
His personal artifacts have been donated to the Anti-Japanese War Museum in Beijing, China.

References

External links
Maine University. 2008. Photo of tomb of Dr. Hans Müller at Babaoshan Revolutionary Cemetery in Beijing, China. Photo taken by Marilyn Shea. 
GLOBALink | "I am an American, I also want to become a CPC member"

1915 births
1994 deaths
Scientists from Düsseldorf
Chinese paediatricians
Eighth Route Army surgeons
German emigrants to China
Naturalized citizens of the People's Republic of China
German Ashkenazi Jews
Chinese Jews
Chinese people of German-Jewish descent
Burials at Babaoshan Revolutionary Cemetery
University of Basel alumni